The 2015 Valencian regional election was held on Sunday, 24 May 2015, to elect the 9th Corts of the Valencian Community. All 99 seats in the Corts were up for election. The election was held simultaneously with regional elections in twelve other autonomous communities and local elections all throughout Spain.

While incumbent President Alberto Fabra's People's Party (PP) remained as the party with the most votes, it lost 24 seats and 22 percentage points compared to its 2011 result, losing the absolute majority it had held in the Corts  since 1999. This result was attributed to the party's management of the economic crisis, as well as the various corruption scandals that affected the PP throughout the entire 2011–2015 period, some of which were unveiled just weeks before the election. The Socialist Party of the Valencian Country (PSPV–PSOE) came second, with 23 seats, 10 fewer than in 2011 and  the worst electoral result in its history.

Three other parties achieved representation, of which two were newly formed since 2011: Compromís, with 19 seats, Podemos and C's. EUPV, the main party in a coalition of other forces known as Acord Ciutadà (Valencian for "Citizen Agreement"), did not reach the 5% minimum  threshold to achieve representation and therefore lost all of its seats in the Corts. Turnout was, at 69.6%, the lowest since 1999. Subsequently, Alberto Fabra announced he would retire from his party's leadership in the region after a PSPV–Compromís coalition with Podemos' support expelled the PP from the regional government after 20 years in power. Ximo Puig from the PSPV–PSOE was elected as new regional President.

Overview

Electoral system
The Corts Valencianes were the devolved, unicameral legislature of the Valencian autonomous community, having legislative power in regional matters as defined by the Spanish Constitution and the Valencian Statute of Autonomy, as well as the ability to vote confidence in or withdraw it from a regional president.

Voting for the Corts was on the basis of universal suffrage, which comprised all nationals over 18 years of age, registered in the Valencian Community and in full enjoyment of their political rights. Additionally, Valencians abroad were required to apply for voting before being permitted to vote, a system known as "begged" or expat vote. The 99 members of the Corts Valencianes were elected using the D'Hondt method and a closed list proportional representation, with a threshold of five percent of valid votes—which included blank ballots—being applied regionally. Parties not reaching the threshold were not taken into consideration for seat distribution. Seats were allocated to constituencies, corresponding to the provinces of Alicante, Castellón and Valencia, with each being allocated an initial minimum of 20 seats and the remaining 39 being distributed in proportion to their populations (provided that the seat-to-population ratio in any given province did not exceed three times that of any other).

Election date
The term of the Corts Valencianes expired four years after the date of their previous election, unless they were dissolved earlier. The election decree was required to be issued no later than the twenty-fifth day prior to the date of expiry of parliament and published on the following day in the Official Journal of the Valencian Government (DOGV), with election day taking place on the fifty-fourth day from publication. The previous election was held on 22 May 2011, which meant that the legislature's term would have expired on 22 May 2015. The election decree was required to be published no later than 28 April 2015, with the election taking place on the fifty-fourth day from publication, setting the latest possible election date for the Corts on Sunday, 21 June 2015.

The president had the prerogative to dissolve the Corts Valencianes and call a snap election, provided that no motion of no confidence was in process. In the event of an investiture process failing to elect a regional president within a two-month period from the first ballot, the Corts were to be automatically dissolved and a fresh election called.

Background
The 2011 regional election had resulted in the People's Party (PP) increasing its absolute majority despite losing votes, thanks to the collapse of the Socialist Party of the Valencian Country vote, which scored its worst historical result up to that point. However, after 16 years of uninterrupted rule, corruption scandals involving the PP began to erupt. Two months after the election, President Francisco Camps resigned because of his alleged implication in the Gürtel corruption scandal, being replaced as president of the Valencian Government by Alberto Fabra. The following years saw the unveiling of a series of corruption scandals that rocked the PP, involving party deputies, mayors, local councillors, two Corts's speakers and former regional president José Luis Olivas. At one point, about 20% of the party members in the Corts Valencianes—11 out of 55—were involved in various corruption cases; a joke popularized at the time said that they would become the third political force in the Corts Valencianes, only behind PP and PSOE, if they were to form their own parliamentary group. The regional party leadership also had to cope with accusations of illegal financing, as well as possible embezzlement offences in the additional costs incurred in the Formula 1 project and Pope Benedict XVI's 2006 visit to Valencia.

At the same time, the regional government had to deal with the effects of an ongoing financial crisis. Despite the regional decision to ask for a bailout from the central government headed by Mariano Rajoy in July 2012, its economic situation remained severe. Fabra's government had to close down RTVV, the regional public television broadcasting channel, because of financing issues, a decision which was met with widespread protests.

The 2014 European Parliament election resulted in enormous losses for the PP, which, in the largest Valencian cities, lost almost half of its votes in percentage terms compared to the previous elections. Both the economic crisis and corruption scandals helped hasten the party's decline, which had already seen support drop in opinion polls since 2011. The Spanish Socialist Workers' Party found itself unable to gain any of the PP's lost support and lost votes too, to the benefit of until then minority parties such as United Left of the Valencian Country (EUPV), Union, Progress and Democracy (UPyD), Citizens (C's), Compromís or the newly created Podemos party.

Parties and candidates
The electoral law allowed for parties and federations registered in the interior ministry, coalitions and groupings of electors to present lists of candidates. Parties and federations intending to form a coalition ahead of an election were required to inform the relevant Electoral Commission within ten days of the election call, whereas groupings of electors needed to secure the signature of at least one percent of the electorate in the constituencies for which they sought election, disallowing electors from signing for more than one list of candidates.

Below is a list of the main parties and electoral alliances which contested the election:

Opinion polls
The table below lists voting intention estimates in reverse chronological order, showing the most recent first and using the dates when the survey fieldwork was done, as opposed to the date of publication. Where the fieldwork dates are unknown, the date of publication is given instead. The highest percentage figure in each polling survey is displayed with its background shaded in the leading party's colour. If a tie ensues, this is applied to the figures with the highest percentages. The "Lead" column on the right shows the percentage-point difference between the parties with the highest percentages in a poll. When available, seat projections determined by the polling organisations are displayed below (or in place of) the percentages in a smaller font; 50 seats were required for an absolute majority in the Corts Valencianes.

Results

Overall

Distribution by constituency

Aftermath

Notes

References
Opinion poll sources

Other

2015 in the Valencian Community
Valencian Community
Regional elections in the Valencian Community
May 2015 events in Spain